Chrysoritis endymion, the Endymion opal, is a species of butterfly in the family Lycaenidae. It is endemic to South Africa.

The wingspan is 30–34 mm for males and 30–38 mm for females. Adults are on wing from November to January. There is one extended generation per year.

References

Butterflies described in 1962
Chrysoritis
Endemic butterflies of South Africa
Taxonomy articles created by Polbot